is the ninth studio album by Japanese pop band Pizzicato Five. It was released on September 30, 1995 by the Nippon Columbia imprint Triad. The album is highly inspired by 1960s French cinema and music. It was reissued by Readymade Records on September 30, 2000 and March 31, 2006.

Track listing

Charts

References

External links
 

1995 albums
Pizzicato Five albums
Nippon Columbia albums
Japanese-language albums